Qian County or Qianxian is a county under the administration of the prefecture-level city of Xianyang, in the central part of Shaanxi province, China.

Administrative divisions
Qian County is divided into 1 subdistrict and 15 towns, which are further divided into 173 administrative villages. The county's administrative officers are located in Chengguan Subdistrict.

Geography 
The county is bordered by Liquan County to the east, Xingping City and Wugong County to the south, Fufeng County to the west, Yongshou County to the north and west, and Linyou County to the west. The northern portion of Qian County is higher in altitude than the southern portion.

Climate 
Qian County has an average annual precipitation of 539 mm, and an average annual temperature of 12.6 °C.

History

Neolithic Age 
Qianling County's history can be traced as far back as the Neolithic Age, due to two archaeological studies which uncovered the ruins of Neolithic settlements. These digs uncovered a variety of human tools, such as stone axes and pottery. The uncovered village ruins sat at the confluence of two rivers, and exhibited evidence which suggests that these villagers were well-versed in both agriculture and animal husbandry.

Tang Dynasty 
The county's name derives from the Tang settlement of Qianzhou [zh], which was established in present-day Qian County in 895 CE.

People's Republic of China 
The county came under control of the People's Republic of China in 1949, and was incorporated as part of the Shaan-Gan-Ning Border Region until its dissolution one year later. The area's jurisdiction would be further altered in 1956, 1959, 1961, 1968, and 1984.

During Mao Zedong's Down to the Countryside Movement, famous director Zhang Yimou was sent to Qian County, where he worked as a farmer and painter.

Historical monuments

Economy 
The county recorded a GDP of 17.16 billion Renminbi, a 0.9% increase from the previous year. The average annual disposable income for urban residents was 35,485 Renminbi in 2019, and was 12,114 Renminbi for rural residents, an annual growth of 8.5% and 9.4%, respectively.

Agriculture 
Key crops for the county include wheat, corn, rapeseed, apples, pears, peaches, grapes, and persimmons. Common livestock include pigs, cows, and goats.

Industry 
The county has three major industrial parks, one producing auto parts, another producing textiles, and the other producing food and drug products.

Culture 
Qian County's local cuisine has a number of distinct local dishes, such as a unique type of tofu soup, and a type of fried cake.

Transport 
A number of highways pass through the county, including China National Highway 312, the G70 Expressway, Shaanxi Provincial Road 107, and Shaanxi Provincial Road 108.

A number of railways, such as the Yinchuan-Xi'an High Speed Railway, the Xi'an-Pingliang Railway [zh], and the Xi'an-Famen Railway pass through the city.

References

External links 
 Qian County Official Government Website

County-level divisions of Shaanxi
Xianyang